Bruce Gentry was an aviation adventure comic strip by , distributed by the Post-Hall Syndicate. It debuted March 25, 1945, and by July the strip had expanded to 35 newspapers.

Characters and story
Comic strip historian Coulton Waugh called Bailey's Bruce Gentry a "job of very high technical skill." He further credited the artist with mastery of "exact perspective, high flexibility of expression and a feeling for drama." Despite such high praise near the time of its inception, the Bruce Gentry series was not a long-term success. It ended January 6, 1951 with Gentry marrying his sweetheart Cleo Patric.

Comics historian Don Markstein took note of the Milton Caniff influence:

Comic book

In 1948-49, Four Star Publications and Superior Publishers, Ltd. teamed to publish eight issues of a Bruce Gentry reprint comic book. After the first issue (January 1948) from Four Star, the numbering was continued by Superior when it published issue #2 (November 1948). The earliest issues carried the subtitle, "America's Famous Newspaper Comic Strip". Superior maintained the run until issue #8 (July 1949). The subtitle on the final issue was "Romantic Adventures for Teen-agers!!"

Film

Bailey's strip was adapted into the 1949 Bruce Gentry movie serial with Tom Neal in the title role.

References

1945 comics debuts
1951 comics endings
American comics adapted into films
Gentry, Bruce
American comic strips
Aviation comics
Gentry, Bruce
Gentry, Bruce
Gentry, Bruce
War comics
Comics set during World War II